Amphionthe oberthuri is a species of beetle in the family Cerambycidae. It was described by Achard in 1913.

References

Trachyderini
Beetles described in 1913